The River of Stars may refer to:

 The Milky Way galaxy
 The River of Stars (novel), a 1913 novel by Edgar Wallace
 The River of Stars (film), a 1921 silent film adaptation
 An episode of Space: Above and Beyond
 River of Stars, a novel by Guy Gavriel Kay